Lola Benarroche (born 15 March 1991) is a French judoka.

He is the bronze medallist of the 2016 Judo Grand Slam Abu Dhabi in the -57 kg category.

References

External links
 
 

1991 births
Living people
French female judoka
21st-century French women